John Raymond Gillam (1909 – 23 March 1998) was a professional rugby league footballer in the Australian competition the New South Wales Rugby League (NSWRL).

Playing career
Gillam  began his career in the lower Grades at Glebe before moving to the Eastern suburbs club, he only appeared in a few first grade matches at Easts in 1931 but was a member of that club's 3rd grade winning side in 1930. Gillam, the brother-in-law of Sir Donald Bradman, also played for North Sydney for two seasons in 1934–1935 and Western Suburbs for two seasons between 1935–1936 before retiring.

Gillam died on 23 March 1998, aged 88.

References

The Encyclopedia Of Rugby League Players; Alan Whiticker & Glen Hudson

1909 births
1998 deaths
Australian rugby league players
Sydney Roosters players
Place of birth missing
Western Suburbs Magpies players
North Sydney Bears players
Rugby league players from New South Wales
Rugby league second-rows